Koondukkili  is a 1954 Indian Tamil-language drama film directed and co-produced by T. R. Ramanna. The film stars M. G. Ramachandran, Sivaji Ganesan and B. S. Saroja. Although a commercial failure, it gained historical reputation over time due to the fact it was the only film in which Ramachandran and Ganesan acted together.

Plot 
Thangaraj and Jeeva are friends. Thangaraj is married to Mangala and they have a son. Thangaraj goes to jail for a crime committed by Jeeva. Mangala is left with no money or house to live. Jeeva tries to help Mangala with the sinister motive of having a relationship with her. After she repeatedly refuses his attempts to help her, Jeeva starts to sadistically taunt her, but he could never win her . Meanwhile, Sokki is in love with Jeeva. When Jeeva tries to embrace Mangala, he is struck by thunder and loses his eye sight.
Thangaraj is released from prison and saves Mangala from Jeeva.

Cast

Production 
This is the only film where Tamil superstars M. G. Ramachandran and Sivaji Ganesan acted together. It was written by Vindhan, a social activist and reformist writer.

Soundtrack 
The music was composed by K. V. Mahadevan. Lyrics by Mahakavi Bharathiyar, Thanjai N. Ramaiah Dass, Vindhan, Ka. Mu. Sheriff & A. Maruthakasi. Playback singers are T. M. Soundararajan, K. V. Mahadevan, V. N. Sundharam, P. A. Periyanayaki, T. V. Rathnam, Radha Jayalakshmi & K. Rani.

Reception 
Koondukkili was a commercial failure in its original release, but as it remained the only film in which Ramachandran and Ganesan acted together, it gained historical reputation over time.

References

External links 
 

1950s Tamil-language films
1954 drama films
1954 films
Films directed by T. R. Ramanna
Films scored by K. V. Mahadevan
Indian drama films